Spanish school may refer to:
 Spanish art, especially Spanish painting
 the Spanish Riding School of Vienna
 Destreza, the Spanish school of swordsmanship